Skippy: Adventures in Bushtown is an animated children's series created by Yoram Gross, set in a fictionalised Australian town. It is based on the character Skippy from the 1968 live-action series Skippy the Bush Kangaroo.

It differs from the other Skippy series as it is animated and features anthropomorphic characters. Skippy, for example, is an anthropomorphic, male kangaroo who wears a baseball cap.

Premise
Skippy the Bush Kangaroo (voiced by Jamie Oxenbould) is a young park ranger who resides in Bushtown. He always happens to get in the way of Mayor Croco, his greedy wife Suka, his pack of goons, and his frequent get-rich schemes which often endanger the town.

Characters
Skippy: A bush kangaroo and the protagonist. He works as the park ranger of Bushtown. He is a very thoughtful, caring, dutiful, and well-educated sort doing what he can to keep Bushtown in order and its people happy.
Matilda Roo: A bush kangaroo who casts the news on television around Bushtown and the host of Bushtown Tonight. Usually, she is first on the scene and she's a good friend of Skippy, open to his ideas.
Professor Angus McPouch: A Scottish-accented Pelican who invents gizmos to improve progress in Bushtown. Half of his inventions don't always have a successful testing phase.
 Mayor Croco: A crocodile and the primary antagonist. He starts out as a garbage collector and becomes mayor of Bushtown by a pure stroke of luck, but he doesn't do his fair service for the people and regards Skippy as a hindrance to his campaign. 
Damon: A rat and one of Croco's goons who serves as his chauffeur, with a voice based on former Australian Prime Minister Bob Hawke.
Sirloin: A bull and one of Croco's goons, with a voice-based on Sylvester Stallone.
 Bruiser: A boar and another of Croco's goons, with a voice based on Arnold Schwarzenegger.
Suka: Croco's spoiled and prissy wife with an obsession for cleanliness.
Pos:  A possum cameraman, with a voice that resembles that of Eddie Murphy. His character design and voice is reused from Slick, who appeared in two episodes of Blinky Bill.
Bomba: A wombat boom operator for Matilda's shows.
Mayor Plato Bill: The previous mayor of Bushtown who had been in service for 50 years before Croco.
Mr. Roge: The recorded producer teaching Suka to sing.
Mrs. Kooka: Professor McPouch's maid.
Rowdy: a rat is Captain Numbat's assistant.
Giselle: a koala who wears a magenta dress and a yellow bow. She is reused as Myrtle in Blinky Bill.

Voice cast
 Jamie Oxenbould as Skippy
 Robyn Moore as Matilda, Suka, other characters
Keith Scott as Mayor Croco, Damon, Bruiser, Sirloin, Pos, Bomba, Professor McPouch, other characters

Episodes

Film
 Skippy Saves Bushtown, a feature-length special.

Video games
 Skippy's Cartoon Maker PC game.
 Skippy: The Curse of the Temple of Ock

References

External links
 

Nine Network original programming
Australian children's animated adventure television series
1998 Australian television series debuts
1999 Australian television series endings
1990s Australian animated television series
Skippy the Bush Kangaroo
Television series about kangaroos and wallabies